Gallagher's Steakhouse is a steakhouse restaurant at 228 West 52nd Street in the Theater District in Manhattan, New York City. It was founded in November 1927 by Helen Gallagher, a former Ziegfeld girl, and wife of Edward Gallagher (1873–1929), and Jack Solomon, a colorful gambler with a large loyal following from the sporting element. These were the days of Prohibition and Gallagher's was one of the first speakeasy gathering places for gamblers, sports figures, and stars of  Broadway.  There is now a location in the New York-New York Hotel & Casino in Las Vegas.

The restaurant is next door to the Alvin (now Neil Simon) Theatre, which opened a few days afterward.

History
In 1933, when FDR took office he fulfilled his promise to end Prohibition. With liquor now legal, Gallagher and Solomon brought a new style of restaurant: Broadway's first steak house. This is where the first “New York Strip” steak was served. The establishment was basic and had the informal atmosphere of a speakeasy mixed with an American country inn. The walls were covered with photos of the stars of Broadway, Hollywood, business, politics, and athletes past and present. Even the stars of Belmont Park and Aqueduct Racetrack at Jamaica are honored.

When Helen died, Jack Solomon married Irene Hayes, who was also a former Ziegfeld girl and one of the top florists in Manhattan whose business is still known as Irene Hayes Wadley & Smythe. After a number of years at the helm, as the sole owner of Gallaghers, Hayes decided to sell and chose Jerome Brody, the restaurateur responsible for the Rainbow Room and the Four Seasons.

Contemporary times
In 2008, the menu at Gallaghers was changed by the new management. Most important among the changes was the removal and exclusion of Porterhouse steak, which once 'graced' the frozen windows of the meat locker that greets customers as they enter the restaurant. This caused some of Gallagher's old customers to complain about the removal of the Porterhouse, which some believe originated in New York.

The Steakhouse was featured in the 2002 movie Monday Night Mayhem.

The Trophy Room is a space for business meetings, private dining or events. Located on the second floor it features a bar, real wood-paneled walls and an extensive photo collection. The Trophy Room accommodates 110 seated, 200 reception style, 100 theater style, and the entire restaurant 400 seated.

In January 2013, Gallaghers was purchased by Long Island restaurateur Dean Poll, who also owns Central Park's Loeb Boathouse. Gallagher's closed for renovations in July 2013.

Gallaghers Steakhouse re-opened in early February 2014 with a new menu, which does include the porterhouse, and renovated interior.

Franchise locations 
Gallaghers Steakhouse, New York City
Gallagher's Steak House, Las Vegas
Gallagher's Steak House, Atlantic City's Resorts International Hotel & Casino

See also
 List of restaurants in New York City
 List of steakhouses

References

External links
Official Site: Gallagher's Steakhouse, NYC

Restaurants established in 1927
Broadway theatre
Drinking establishments in Manhattan
Restaurants in Manhattan
Steakhouses in New York City
Speakeasies
Midtown Manhattan
1927 establishments in New York City